"Touch" is a song by American R&B singer Omarion. It was released on February 11, 2005, as the second single off his 2005 debut album O. The song was written by Pharrell Williams and includes his background vocals on the song's bridge. The song was produced by The Neptunes. "Touch" was originally planned to be the first single from O in the UK. However, it was eventually decided that as in the US, "O" would be the first single from the album there as well. It was a minor hit in the US, peaking at only number 94 on the Billboard Hot 100 and number 35 on the Hot R&B/Hip-Hop Songs chart.

Chart performance
"Touch" debuted at number 99 on the Billboard Hot 100 the week of June 25, 2005. It moved to number 98 the week after before leaving the chart. It re-entered the chart and peaked at number 94 the week of July 30, 2005.

Music video
The music video of "Touch" was directed by Diane Martel and choreographed by Shane Sparks and Blake Anthony; with Rasheed Musbah as co-choreographing consultant. At the beginning of the video, Omarion sees a sexy girl (Danielle Polanco) outside a club. Omarion showcases some elaborate choreography. They dance their way down the street until the girl's friends drive by and Omarion ducks into a store. When they leave, he comes out and they continue their dance to her apartment. The video ends with her putting a stopper in the door, inviting him in.

Live performance
Omarion performed "Touch" along with "O" at the 2005 BET Awards on July 28, 2005. The performance was Military-themed with Omarion and the dancers dressed in Army outfits. For the "Touch" section, Danielle Polanco (who appeared in the song's video) came out on stage and danced with Omarion.

Awards and nominations
The song was nominated for Choice Music: R&B/Hip-Hop Track at the 2005 Teen Choice Awards, losing to "1, 2 Step" by Ciara featuring Missy Elliott.

Track listing
US 12"
"Touch" (Album Version)
"Touch" (Instrumental W/Background Vocals)
"O" (Urban Clean Mix) (featuring Ray Cash)
"O" (Urban Instrumental Mix)

Credits and personnel
Credits are adapted from the liner notes of O.
Recording
 Recorded at The Record Plant, LA
 Mixed at Right Track and Silent Sound Studios

Personnel
 The Neptunes – producer
 Andrew Coleman – recording
 Brian Garten – recording
 Phil Tan – mixer
 Justin Shturtz – assistant engineer
 Rob Skipworth – assistant engineer

Charts

References

2004 songs
2004 singles
2005 singles
Omarion songs
Epic Records singles
Song recordings produced by the Neptunes
Songs written by Pharrell Williams
Music videos directed by Diane Martel